Makhdoom Mehboob Zaman is a Pakistani politician who is the current Provincial Minister of Sindh for Revenue and Relief, in office since 19 August 2018. He has been a member of the Provincial Assembly of Sindh since August 2018.

Early life and education
He was born on 25 May 1991 in Karachi, Pakistan.

He received a degree of Master of Arts in Political Science from the University of Sindh.

Political career

He was elected to the Provincial Assembly of Sindh as a candidate of Pakistan Peoples Party from Constituency PS-58 (Matiari-I) in 2018 Pakistani general election.

On 19 August, he was inducted into the provincial Sindh cabinet of Chief Minister Syed Murad Ali Shah and was made Provincial Minister of Sindh for Revenue and Relief.

References

Living people
Makhdoom family
Pakistan People's Party MPAs (Sindh)
1991 births
People from Matiari District